Kennedy McIntosh (January 21, 1949 – March 6, 2009) was an American professional basketball player whose NBA career lasted from 1971-1975. At 6'7" tall, he played the forward position.

Though born in Detroit, McIntosh attended high school on Michigan's western half, playing basketball at South Haven High School in South Haven. McIntosh went to college at Eastern Michigan University, where he scored 2,219 points and grabbed 1,426 rebounds. He was then drafted in the first round (15th pick) of the 1971 NBA Draft by the Chicago Bulls.

McIntosh played with the Bulls until October 1972, when he was traded to the Seattle SuperSonics for Gar Heard and a draft pick. He spent the rest of his career with Seattle, retiring in 1975 because of injury. Over his NBA career, McIntosh averaged 5.3 points and 3.9 rebounds per game.

McIntosh's number 54 jersey was retired by Eastern Michigan University in 2006.

McIntosh died of a stroke at UCLA-Santa Monica Hospital, Los Angeles on March 6, 2009, aged 60.

References

External links 
 https://web.archive.org/web/20070207083800/http://www.databasebasketball.com/players/playerpage.htm?ilkid=MCINTKE01
 https://www.basketball-reference.com/players/m/mcintke01.html

1949 births
2009 deaths
American men's basketball players
Basketball players from Detroit
Chicago Bulls draft picks
Chicago Bulls players
Eastern Michigan Eagles men's basketball players
Power forwards (basketball)
Seattle SuperSonics players